Mary Anne Franks is an American legal scholar, author, activist, and media commentator. She is a professor of law and the Michael R. Klein Distinguished Scholar Chair at the University of Miami School of Law, where she teaches First Amendment law, Second Amendment law, criminal law, criminal procedure, family law, and law and technology. She also serves as President and Legislative and Technology Policy Director of the Cyber Civil Rights Initiative.

Franks' scholarly work focuses on online harassment, free speech, discrimination, and violence. Franks also writes for various news media outlets, including The New York Times, The Washington Post, The Atlantic, and The Guardian. She was a regular contributor to The Huffington Post. As a frequent legal commentator in the media on cyberlaw and criminal law issues, Franks has been quoted in publications such as The New York Times, The Wall Street Journal, The Washington Post, and The New Yorker, and she has appeared on CNN, the Today show, and Vice News. Franks is a co-producer of the 2015 film Hot Girls Wanted, a documentary produced by the actress Rashida Jones that examines the "professional amateur" porn industry.

Franks's work in advocating for legislative, technological, and social reform on the issue of nonconsensual pornography ("revenge porn") has been instrumental in drafting recent state legislation against the practice in the United States. She has worked with Congresswoman Jackie Speier on a federal criminal bill, the Intimate Privacy Protection Act (IPPA), which evolved into the ENOUGH Act, and again into the SHIELD Act. The SHIELD Act is now part of the Violence Against Women Reauthorization Act of 2021, which the United States House of Representatives passed with bipartisan support in March 2021. Franks also advises major tech companies on their privacy and abuse policies. In 2015, several major tech companies, most notably Google, announced that they would be adding sexually explicit images published without consent to their privacy and removal policies. In 2014, Franks was named one of "The Heroes in the Fight to Save the Internet" by the Daily Dot.

Franks is the author of The Cult of the Constitution: Our Deadly Devotion to Guns and Free Speech, which won a gold medal at the 2020 Independent Publisher Book Awards as well as the 2020 Association of American Publishers PROSE Award for Legal Studies and Excellence in Social Sciences. Her second book, Fearless Speech, is expected in 2023.

Early life and education 
Mary Anne Franks was born in Indiana to Kang Tu-Kwei, a Taiwanese woman, and Jesse Franks, an American World War II veteran who passed away when Franks was two years old. After her father's death, Franks spent most of her childhood in Pine Bluff, Arkansas, a location that Franks described as "not the most racially sensitive place." She attended Loyola University New Orleans, where she graduated summa cum laude in 1999 with a major in Philosophy and English Literature and minor in Classics. 

She was awarded a Rhodes Scholarship in 1998. At Oxford University, she earned her MPhil in European literature, with distinction, in June 2001 and her DPhil in modern languages and literature in January 2004. Her examination field of continental philosophy, psychoanalytic theory, gender theory, and political theory culminated in her doctoral thesis, "Enjoying Women: Sex, Psychoanalysis, and the Political." 

In 2007, Franks graduated cum laude from Harvard Law School, where she served as senior executive editor of the Harvard Journal of Law & Gender and executive editor of the Harvard Human Rights Journal. During her time in law school, she received several awards, including the Harvard Law School Association Alumnae Fellowship, Reginald Lewis International Internship, the Chayes International Public Service Fellow in 2005, and the National Association of Women Lawyers Outstanding Law School Student Award in 2007.

Career 
Between 2004 and 2005, Franks taught courses in ethics, world religions, and introductory philosophy within the Department of Humanities at Quincy College in Massachusetts. During her time at Harvard Law School, Franks clerked for the Office of the Prosecutor at the International Criminal Court. She also worked from 2005 to 2008 as a lecturer for the Department of Social Studies and as a teaching fellow for the government, philosophy, and English departments. From 2008 to 2010, she was a Bigelow Fellow and lecturer in law at the University of Chicago Law School as well as a faculty affiliate for the Center for Gender Studies. 

Franks has taught at the University of Miami School of Law since 2010. Between 2010 and 2015, Franks served as an associate professor of law and was promoted to professor of law in 2015. In 2013, she served as a visiting professor at the University of Navarra in Pamplona, Spain. In 2019, Franks was recognized as a Dean's Distinguished Scholar for the Profession, an honor bestowed upon University of Miami School of Law faculty members whose scholarly contributions to the legal profession are deemed significant and influential. In 2021, she was appointed to the Michael R. Klein Distinguished Scholar Chair "to recognize her substantial contributions and ongoing accomplishments in scholarship and advocacy at the confluence of civil rights and technology."

Since 2013, Franks has worked in various capacities with the Cyber Civil Rights Initiative (CCRI), a nonprofit organization that seeks to combat cyber harassment, nonconsensual pornography, and online abuse through legislation, tech policy reform, and victim support. From 2014 to 2018, she served as CCRI's Vice President. SInce 2018, she has served as CCRI's President. In addition, she has served as CCRI's Legislative & Tech Policy Director since its founding.

Franks is licensed to practice law in the District of Columbia.

In October 2022, Franks joined the Council for Responsible Social Media project launched by Issue One to address the negative mental, civic, and public health impacts of social media in the United States co-chaired by former House Democratic Caucus Leader Dick Gephardt and former Massachusetts Lieutenant Governor Kerry Healey.

Personal life 
Franks is Taiwanese-American.

In addition to her work in legal scholarship and activism, she is an instructor in Krav Maga, a self-defense system developed for the military in Israel. On the topic of women's empowerment through honing self-defense skills, Franks said, "Society puts a lot of focus on women as objects as opposed to women asserting their subject-hood. I’m concerned with ways that women can create a relationship with their bodies that’s about making them stronger, faster, as well as more secure." She is also a vocal proponent of hand-to-hand self-defense techniques over the use of firearms: "What troubles me about Florida when it comes to the psychology of self-defense is that our answer for defending ourselves is always a gun. Krav Maga is a nuanced approach to defending oneself and protecting one’s space. You can respond effectively, but no one gets shot, no one dies."

Selected works 

 Articles
 
 
 
 
 
 
 
 
 
 
 
 
 
 
 
 
 Academic Scholarship

References

External links
Mary Anne Franks faculty page, University of Miami Law School

Loyola University New Orleans alumni
American Rhodes Scholars
Living people
Krav Maga practitioners
Harvard Law School alumni
University of Miami faculty
American feminist writers
American legal scholars
American activists
1977 births
American women of Asian descent
American people of Taiwanese descent
First Amendment scholars
Internet theorists